Af Klintberg is a Swedish surname of a noble family from Scania. Notable people with the surname include:

Bengt af Klintberg (born 1938), Swedish ethnologist, folklorist, and artist
Gunnar af Klintberg, Swedish Army officer
Olle af Klintberg, Swedish folk musician

Swedish-language surnames